RNAS East Haven (HMS Peewit) is a former satellite Royal Naval Air Station located near East Haven, Angus, Scotland.

The following units were here at some point:
 731 Naval Air Squadron
 767 Naval Air Squadron
 768 Naval Air Squadron
 769 Naval Air Squadron
 826 Naval Air Squadron

See also

 List of air stations of the Royal Navy

References

East Haven